One World: Together at Home (also known as Together at Home) is a benefit concert that was organized by Global Citizen of New York City and curated by singer Lady Gaga in support of the World Health Organization. The special was intended to promote the practice of social distancing while staying together during the COVID-19 pandemic.

On April 18, 2020, a six-hour pre-show was streamed online immediately prior to the television global broadcast. The online portion of the event was hosted through YouTube by actress and presenter Jameela Jamil (first hour), actor Matthew McConaughey (second hour), actress Danai Gurira (third hour), singer Becky G (fourth hour), actress Laverne Cox (fifth hour) and actor Don Cheadle (sixth hour). It featured appearances from numerous celebrities.

Participants of concert series

 Alex Gaskarth
 Alissa White-Gluz
 Amy Lee
 Amy Shark
 Anne-Marie
 Anthony Hamilton
 Camila Cabello
 Carla Morrison
 Caroline Hjelt
 Celeste
 Charlie Puth
 Chris Martin
 Common
 Dermot Kennedy
 Elize Ryd
 G Flip
 Gloria Gaynor
 Guy Sebastian
 Ha*Ash
 H.E.R.
 Jack Johnson
 James Bay
 Jason Mraz
 John Legend
 Jon Batiste
 Joshua Bassett
 Julianne Hough
 Juanes
 Koffee
 Liam Payne
 Lindsey Stirling
 Meghan Trainor
 Niall Horan
 Nikki Yanofsky
 Noah Cyrus
 Nomfusi
 OneRepublic
 Rod and Ruby Stewart
 Rufus Wainwright
 Simone Simons
 Tarja Turunen
 Vance Joy
 Wesley Schultz
 Within Temptation
 Years & Years
 Ziggy Marley

Television special
The television special, titled One World: Together at Home, was curated in collaboration between Global Citizen and singer-songwriter Lady Gaga, which benefited the World Health Organization's COVID-19 Solidarity Response Fund. Jimmy Fallon, Jimmy Kimmel, and Stephen Colbert hosted the show, which was a syndicated broadcast that aired on April 18, 2020. The special was also simulcast on select U.S. cable television networks, streaming platforms, and international broadcast networks. In the UK, the show was hosted by Clara Amfo, Dermot O'Leary and Claudia Winkleman and was broadcast on BBC One. The special was broadcast on CBS, ABC, NBC, The CW and other global networks and platforms.

During the six-hour online pre-show

Musical performances (in order of appearance) 
Prior to the event, Alanis Morissette was announced to appear on the show, but did not do so. George the Poet, Little Mix, Rag'n'Bone Man and Tom Jones only appeared in the UK broadcast.

Appearances (in order of appearance)

During the global television broadcast 
Prior to the event, actresses Bridget Moynahan and Lily Tomlin, actor James McAvoy, and tennis player Naomi Osaka were announced to appear in the show, but did not do so.

Musical performances (in order of appearance)

Appearances (in order of appearance)

Broadcast
The television special was broadcast on NBC, ABC, CBS, and The CW in the United States. It was also aired on Spanish-language television network Univisión. The special was also simulcast on networks owned by ViacomCBS (BET, BET Her, CMT, Comedy Central, Logo TV, MTV, MTV2, MTV Classic, MTV Live, Nickelodeon, Paramount Network, Pop, Tr3s, TV Land, and VH1), NBCUniversal (Bravo, E!, MSNBC, NBCSN, Syfy, Universo and USA Network), Walt Disney Television (Freeform and National Geographic), Katz Broadcasting (Bounce TV and Laff), Bloomberg Television, and on AXS TV. iHeartMedia also participated in the broadcast.

In the United Kingdom, the BBC commissioned a Britain-centric broadcast of One World: Together at Home that aired on BBC One on Sunday 19 April at 7:15pm, presented by BBC Radio personalities Clara Amfo, Claudia Winkleman and Dermot O'Leary. Produced for the BBC by Twofour, it featured additional performances from the acts featured in the main special along with exclusive performances from UK acts such as Little Mix and interviews with, and surprises for, front line workers. In Ireland, RTÉ (like the BBC) aired a unique version of One World: Together at Home fronted by comedienne and influencer Dorieann Garrihy and TV presenter Eoghan McDermott.

International broadcasters

 Africa: BET, Comedy Central, MTV Africa, MTV Base and Vuzu
 Albania: RTSH 2
 Argentina: Telefe, Comedy Central, MTV, MTV Hits, Paramount Network, VH1, VH1 HD, VH1 MegaHits, TNT, AXN, Sony Channel and National Geographic.
 Australia: Network 10, Seven Network, National Geographic, MTV Australia, E! (Australia) and beIN Sports
 Austria: Comedy Central
 Belgium: Eén, Q2, and MTV
 Bolivia: TNT
 Brazil: Rede Globo, Multishow, Comedy Central, MTV, Paramount Network, VH1 HD, VH1 MegaHits, TNT, AXN, and Sony Channel
 Bulgaria: Nova
 Cambodia: beIN Sports
 Canada: CTV, CTV 2, Citytv, Global, CBC, Ici Radio-Canada Télé, ABC Spark, CP24, Much, MTV, National Geographic, TSN, Vrak, iHeartRadio Canada, Kiss Radio, Virgin Radio and CBC Music
 Caribbean: Digicel and TNT
 Central America: TNT, AXN, and Sony Channel
 Chile: Chilevisión, TNT, AXN, and Sony Channel
 Colombia: Caracol Televisión, Comedy Central, MTV, MTV Hits, Paramount Network, VH1 HD, VH1 MegaHits, TNT, AXN, and Sony Channel
 Czech Republic: Prima Comedy Central
 Denmark: TV 2, VH1 and Paramount Network
 East Timor: beIN Sports
 Ecuador: TNT
 Europe: MTV, VH1 and VH1 Classic
 Finland: Yle TV2, Yle Areena and Paramount Network
 France: France 2, France 4, beIN Sports, BET, CStar, MTV, MTV Hits, W9, France Inter and RTL2
 Germany: ZDFneo, RTL, MTV and Comedy Central
 Hong Kong: Joox, TVB Finance & Information Channel, Hong Kong International Business Channel and beIN Sports
 Hungary: RTL Spike, MTV and Comedy Central
 India: AXN, Colors Infinity, Comedy Central, Sony Liv, Sony Pix and VH1
 Indonesia: beIN Sports
 Israel: MTV
 Italy: Rai 1, Rai Radio 2, MTV, VH1, Comedy Central, MTV Music and National Geographic
 Ireland: RTÉ2 and RTÉ 2FM
 Japan: Fuji TV
 Laos: beIN Sports
 Malaysia: beIN Sports
 Mexico: Comedy Central, MTV, MTV Hits, Paramount Network, VH1, VH1 HD, VH1 MegaHits, AXN, and Sony Channel 
 Middle East: beIN Sports
 Myanmar: Canal+ Gita
 Netherlands: MTV
 New Zealand: beIN Sports and MTV
 Norway: TV 2
 Paraguay: TNT
 Peru: TNT
 Philippines: beIN Sports
 Poland: Canal+, MTV, Paramount Channel and Comedy Central
 Portugal: TVI
 Romania: MTV and Comedy Central
 Russia: MTV
 Singapore: MediaCorp Channel 5, meWatch.sg and beIN Sports
 South Africa: Vuzu
 South Korea: SBS MTV and National Geographic
 Southeast Asia: Comedy Central, MTV, Paramount Channel and National Geographic
 Spain: La 1 and MTV
 Sweden: SVT1, TV4 and Paramount Network
 Switzerland: MTV and Comedy Central
 Thailand: beIN Sports
 Turkey: National Geographic and beIn Sports
 United Arab Emirates: Dubai TV
 United Kingdom: BBC One, Channel 5, MTV, MTV Music, Club MTV, MTV Hits, MTV Rocks, MTV Base and MTV OMG
 Uruguay: TNT
 Venezuela: TNT, AXN, and Sony Channel
 Vietnam: K+ NS

Online streaming
The special was also available on several digital platforms such as Apple, Facebook, Instagram, LiveXLive, Amazon Prime Video, Tidal, TuneIn, Twitch, Twitter, Roblox, Yahoo!, and YouTube. It was planned that Alibaba Youku and Tencent would make streaming in China, but that never happened with no reason made known.

Viewership

Canada
In Canada, the special was watched by 3.13 million viewers on CTV and 1.33 million on Global.

United States

 Broadcast network

 Cable network

Impact 
One World: Together at Home spurred sales gains for the songs performed as part of the event. On April 18, 2020, the songs performed on the show sold more than 12,000 digital downloads—a gain of 735% versus April 17, 2020. The most notable sellers from the two-hour television special were Taylor Swift's "Soon You'll Get Better", Maluma's "Carnaval" and Kacey Musgraves' "Rainbow", as they together accounted for 42% of the total song sales generated by the show. The songs performed during the pre-show broadcast generated 6,000 in sales—up 75% from April 17, 2020.

On April 19, it was reported that the special raised nearly $128 million for coronavirus health care workers. Raising $127 million "puts it on par with the other legendary fundraiser, Live Aid, as the highest grossing charity concert in history," says Forbes. Instead of private individuals, funds were raised from corporations and institutions such as Bloomberg Philanthropies and the Rockefeller Foundation.

Guinness World Records announced on May 22 that the global broadcast special set records for the most musical acts to perform at a remote music festival and the most money raised for charity by a remote music festival. Craig Glenday, Guinness World Records Editor-in-Chief, said in a statement: "The One World: Together at Home special was an extraordinary response to an extraordinary situation. It demonstrates vividly how the power of music can unite us all and help us through challenging times. It's an honor to be able to officially recognize this unforgettable, 'I-Was-There' event as a record-breaker. Congratulations - and thank you - to everyone involved.”

Inspiration 
One World: Together at Home inspired Japanese rock band Luna Sea to design and host a similar event in Japan. Music Aid Fest. ~For Post Pandemic~ aired on Fuji TV One on May 31, 2020, and featured live remotely recorded performances by over 25 artists, including Miyavi, Koda Kumi, Ellegarden, Char and Glim Spanky, to elicit monetary donations to support medical workers and others on the frontline of the COVID-19 pandemic.

One World: Impact 
One World: Impact is a six-episode digital series that shows how things have gone two months after One World: Together at Home.

Sequel

Global Goal: Unite for Our Future 

Global Goal: Unite for Our Future was a summit that aimed to highlight the disproportionate impact of the COVID-19 pandemic on marginalized communities. The accompanying music concert took place on June 27, 2020, presented by Dwayne Johnson with performances by Miley Cyrus, Justin Bieber, and Shakira, among others. The concert aired on television in countries such as Germany and Australia. The patron of the cause is Ursula von der Leyen (President of the European Commission).

See also
 iHeart Living Room Concert for America
 Impact of the COVID-19 pandemic on the music industry
 Live Aid
 "Living in a Ghost Town", a single released by The Rolling Stones shortly after their performance here and also featuring a music video about the effects of quarantine
 Saturday Night Seder
 Stronger Together, Tous Ensemble

Notes and references

Notes

References

External links

COVID-19 pandemic benefit concerts
2020 concerts
2020 television specials
April 2020 events in the United States
Music television specials
Simulcasts
Television shows about the COVID-19 pandemic
Benefit concerts